Addicks may refer to:

People
J. Edward Addicks, Philadelphia gas magnate
Johannes Addicks, Dutch chess player
Karl Addicks, German politician
Lawrence Addicks, president of the Electrochemical Society

Other uses
Charlton Athletic F.C., a football club in south-east London 
Addicks, Houston, Texas
Addicks Reservoir, Texas
Addicks Estates, Delaware